The Muskogee Oilers were a professional, minor league baseball team that played in the Western League in 1933. They began the year in Wichita, Kansas as the Wichita Oilers, but moved to Muskogee, Oklahoma after being evicted from their park in Wichita. Hall of Famer Rube Marquard managed the team at one point, while All-Star pitchers Mort Cooper and Kirby Higbe played for the club.

References

Baseball teams established in 1933
Baseball teams disestablished in 1933
Defunct minor league baseball teams
Defunct baseball teams in Kansas
1933 establishments in Kansas
1933 disestablishments in Oklahoma
Defunct baseball teams in Oklahoma
Defunct Western League teams
Muskogee, Oklahoma